The prohibition on orlah fruit (lit. "uncircumcised" fruit) is a command found in the Bible not to eat fruit produced by a tree during the first three years after planting.  

In rabbinical writings, the orlah prohibition (Hebrew: איסור ערלה) is counted as one of the negative commandments among the 613 commandments. Outside of the land of Israel the prohibition also applies to a certain degree.

Etymology
The Hebrew word orlah literally means "uncircumcised". The use of this term is explained by Shlomo Ephraim Luntschitz as meaning "hidden and sealed" and it alludes to the creation itself.

Context 
Commentators generally assume that the law was good agricultural practice, and that early harvesting would conflict with careful cultivation and pruning during the first three years in order to insure later good harvests and allow maturing of the trees. Grape vines produce fruit in three to six years, almond trees produce some flower buds in the fourth year and some fruit in the fifth, and sources from the Ancient Near East suggest that a good crop of dates was expected in the fourth year. In discussing the commandment that the fruit could not actually be eaten until the fifth year, Rooker (2000) notes that in the Code of Hammurabi a tenant-gardener could not eat of the fruit of an orchard until the fifth year, when he shared the produce with the owner.

Rabbinical writings
The Mishna stipulates that Orlah fruit must be burnt to guarantee that no one benefits from them, and even a garment dyed by way of pigment derived from Orlah is to be destroyed. The ancient custom in the Land of Israel was to mark the ground surrounding Orlah-plantings with crushed potsherds, so as to signify that the fruit grown on the trees are forbidden to be eaten until after the first three years. 

The Sifra points out that the three year count begins on Rosh HaShana (the Jewish new year) and not "tree years" (the Jewish agricultural holiday of Tu Bishvat). Thus, the fruit of a tree only two years and 30 days old may not be considered forbidden.

Outside of the land of Israel 
The Jerusalem Talmud stipulates that "safek orlah" (uncertainty if the product is indeed orlah) is permitted outside of the land of Israel. However, Rabbi Yochanan, in a letter sent to Rav Yehudah and quoted in the Babylonian Talmud, took a starkly stringent approach to the common practice of diasporic Jewry being overly lenient on "safek orlah";

Although orlah is listed in the category of prohibitions pertaining to the Land of Israel ("מצווה שתלויה בארץ ישראל"), it is one of just two commandments of this category that applies outside of Israel as well. This law is considered a law given to Moses at Sinai. Rabbi Eliezer ben Hurcanus held the opinion that the prohibition of orlah does not apply outside the land of Israel.

Questionable fruit 
Faced with an uncertainty as to whether an item is orlah (or a result of orlah usage such as dye, etc.), the mishna prescribes that such product is permitted for consumption so long as the actual removal of orlah product is not "seen" being picked.

The papaya fruit is a subject of rabbinic dispute, as most of its fruit is harvested in the first three years after planting. Some rabbinic authorities maintain that the papaya is not a tree, thus making it orlah-exempt, whereas most rule that the laws of orlah do apply to the papaya. Papain, (a "second crop" enzyme extracted from the papaya peel, used in beer, biscuits, and as a digestive aid) is likewise under rabbinic scrutiny as a dilution ratio of 200:1 (200 non-orlah fruit to 1 part orlah) is required to permit orlah, essentially prohibiting benefiting from this enzyme.

Practice in modern Israel
The orlah laws are observed to this day by modern Jews. The Chief Rabbinate of Israel has allowed the sale of such fruit to non-Jews, but the usual policy is to destroy it.

See also 
 Tu B'Shvat

References

External links
Rules of Orlah in Maimonides’ Code of Jewish Law
 Orthodox Union: 1155. When Does Orlah Apply?

Ancient Israel and Judah
Ancient Near East law
Agriculture in Israel
Book of Leviticus
Horticultural techniques
Horticulture
Jewish law and rituals
Kashrut
Law of Moses
Negative Mitzvoth
Jewish agrarian laws
Land of Israel laws in Judaism
Hebrew words and phrases in the Hebrew Bible
Hebrew words and phrases in Jewish law